Hugh Roy Currie (October 22, 1925 – November 21, 2017) was a Canadian professional ice hockey defenceman who played in one National Hockey League game for the Montreal Canadiens during the 1950–51 NHL season.

See also
List of players who played only one game in the NHL

References

External links

1925 births
2017 deaths
Baltimore Blades (EHL) players
Buffalo Bisons (AHL) players
Calgary Stampeders (WHL) players
Canadian ice hockey defencemen
Houston Huskies players
Ice hockey people from Saskatchewan
Louisville Blades players
Montreal Canadiens players
San Francisco Seals (ice hockey) players
Seattle Totems (WHL) players
Sportspeople from Saskatoon
Springfield Indians players
Syracuse Warriors players
Vancouver Canucks (WHL) players
Victoria Cougars (1949–1961) players
Washington Lions players